Khalil Jalil Hamza (died August 11, 2007) was the governor of Al-Qādisiyyah province, Iraq. He was assassinated on August 11, 2007, along with the province's police chief Major General Khaled Hassan. He was a member of the Supreme Islamic Iraqi Council (SIIC), the biggest Shia party in Iraq. Al Muthanna governor Mohammed Ali al-Hasani, who was also a member of SIIC, was killed later in the month on August 20, 2007.

References

External links
Iraqi Provincial Governor, Police Chief Killed in Roadside Bomb Attack
Fatal bombings seen as retribution
Iraq governor assassinated

2007 deaths
Assassinated Iraqi politicians
Governors of Al-Qādisiyyah Governorate
Iraqi Shia Muslims
Iraqi terrorism victims
Terrorism deaths in Iraq
Islamic Supreme Council of Iraq politicians
Year of birth missing